"Check" a song by American rapper Young Thug. It was released as the lead single from his breakout commercial mixtape Barter 6 on April 1, 2015.

Release
"Check" was released on April 1, 2015 with the music video. The song was later also released on iTunes as a part of Barter 6. The song was located at track number 4 of the album.

Music video
The video for "Check" was released on the content aggregating video blog website of WorldStarHipHop and the website's official YouTube channel on April 1, 2015. It includes cameos by American rapper Birdman and other members of the Cash Money Records crew. The music video was directed by Be El Be.

Chart performance
"Check" debuted and peaked at number 100 on the US Billboard Hot 100 for the chart dated July 11, 2015.

Charts

Weekly charts

Certifications

References

2015 songs
2015 singles
Young Thug songs
300 Entertainment singles
Songs written by Young Thug
Songs written by London on da Track
Song recordings produced by London on da Track